Edward Hill Jr.  (circa 1637–November 30, 1700) was a controversial Virginia planter, local official and politician, who like his father operated Shirley Plantation in part using enslaved labor, as well as briefly served as 20th Speaker of the Virginia House of Burgesses (in 1684), and several times represented Charles City County in that body.

Early and family life
His grandfather, father, and son all shared the name Edward Hill. Of these, probably the most significant was his father Edward Hill who led Virginia forces against usurpers in Maryland and against Native Americans in Virginia, as well as established Shirley Plantation and served several times as Speaker of the House of Burgesses.

This Edward Hill married twice, both times within the First Families of Virginia, daughters of burgesses. In 1680, Hill married Anne Goodrich (1625–1696). Following her death, but in the same year, he married Tabitha Scarborough (1640–1717).  One of his wives was the mother of Edward Hill III (died 1726) who continued to operate Shirley Plantation as well as also served in the House of Burgesses.

Career
Like his father (and as his son would later), Hill operated Shirley Plantation in Charles City County, using indentured and (increasingly) enslaved labor. He also commanded the militia of Charles City County and nearby Surry County.

Charles City County voters elected Hill (like his father) multiple times as one of their representatives in the House of Burgesses, and after the reorganization of 1680, he served a single term in 1684 as its Speaker. 

On the first day of Bacon's Rebellion in 1676, some rebels attempted to get Hill to join them, but he was a friend of Governor Berkeley, and took an active part in suppressing the rebellion, although Bacon's friends expelled him from the House of Burgesses in 1676.

Hill became a subject of the "Charles City Grievances" of May 10, 1677, which accused him of misappropriating county taxes for his own use." He was also accused of misappropriation of public funds before the 3-member royal commission investigating the rebellion, which included his son-in-law Edward Chilton and ultimately recommended that Hill be left our of the new Governor's Council. Nonetheless, on September 29, 1679, during the royal investigation, Deputy Gov. Henry Chicheley (one of Gov. Berkeley's supporters) appointed Hill as the colony's attorney general, although the following year Edmund Jenings arrived from Britain and was sworn in as the colony's attorney general. The commissioners called Hill "the most hated man of all the county where he lived."

A decade later, around 1690, the Lords of Trade again reorganized the British colonial structure, which led to a power struggle between the Burgesses and the new Governor Francis Nicholson. The Burgesses elected Hill as the colony's treasurer in 1691, but the governor refused to acknowledge the Assembly's power to appoint that position, considering it his prerogative. Hill compromised by accepting the lucrative position of collector of revenue for the upper district of the James River. In 1697, Governor Edmund Andros named Hill as Judge of Admiralty for Virginia and North Carolina.

References

1637 births
1700 deaths
Speakers of the Virginia House of Burgesses
House of Burgesses members
People from Charles City County, Virginia